The following is a list of Malayalam films released in the year 1986.

Dubbed films

References

 1986
1985
Malayalam
Fil